Bayqara Rud (also known as Bāy Qarah and Bāyqarah Kūh) is a village in Soluk Rural District, in the Central District of Hashtrud County, East Azerbaijan Province, Iran. At the 2006 census, its population was 505, in 106 families.

References 

Towns and villages in Hashtrud County